Ang Yaman ni Lola is a Philippine television comedy reality show broadcast by GMA Network. Starring Nanette Inventor, it premiered on August 23, 2010 on the network's Dramarama sa Hapon line up. The show concluded on January 21, 2011 with a total of 100 episodes. It was replaced by Alakdana in its timeslot.

Every week, new challenges will be given by Lola Barbie and the most efficient worker of the week will receive P100,000.

Cast and characters

Lead cast
Nanette Inventor as Barbara "Lola Barbie" Benitez

Supporting cast
Sheryl Cruz as Kimberly Hechanova Cabagnot
Benjie Paras as Benjo Cabagnot
Fabio Ide as Boggart
Patricia Ismael as Mayordoma
Joyce Ching as Cheska Hechanova Cabagnot
Aaron Novilla as Agapito Hechanova Cabagnot

Ratings
According to AGB Nielsen Philippines' Mega Manila People/Individual television ratings, the pilot episode of Ang Yaman ni Lola earned a 5.5% rating.

References

External links
 

2010 Philippine television series debuts
2011 Philippine television series endings
Filipino-language television shows
GMA Network original programming
GMA Integrated News and Public Affairs shows
Philippine reality television series